Guy–Perkins High School is a comprehensive six-year public high school in Guy, Arkansas, United States. It is one of four public high schools in Faulkner County and is the sole high school administered by Guy–Perkins School District serving grades 7 through 12. The school's varsity athletic teams have won 12 state championship titles, primarily in basketball.

Athletics 
The Guy–Perkins mascot and athletic emblem is the Thunderbird with blue and gold serving as its school colors.

The Guy–Perkins Thunderbirds compete in the state's smallest classification—Class A, administered by the Arkansas Activities Association. For 2012–14, the Thunderbirds compete in the 1A Region 5 North Conference. Guy–Perkins sponsor teams in volleyball, golf (boys/girls), basketball (boys/girls), baseball, softball, and track and field (boys/girls).

The boys basketball team has won 6 Class A state championships in 1997, 2005, 2006, 2009, 2017, and 2018. 

The girls basketball team has won 5 Class A state championships in 1984, 2001, 2002, 2003, and 2005, and 1 overall state championship in 1984.

References

External links

Public high schools in Arkansas
Schools in Faulkner County, Arkansas